The Lost Vikings is a puzzle-platform game developed by Silicon & Synapse (now Blizzard Entertainment) and published by Interplay. It was originally released for the Super NES in 1993, then subsequently released for the Amiga, Amiga CD32, MS-DOS, and Mega Drive/Genesis systems; the Mega Drive/Genesis version contains five stages not present in any other version of the game, and can also be played by three players simultaneously. Blizzard re-released the game for the Game Boy Advance in 2003. In 2014, the game was added to Battle.net as a free download emulated through DOSBox. In celebration of the company's 30th anniversary, The Lost Vikings was re-released for Microsoft Windows, Nintendo Switch, PlayStation 4 and Xbox One as part of the Blizzard Arcade Collection in February 2021.

In The Lost Vikings, the player controls three separate Vikings with different abilities. The three Vikings must work together to finish each level and find their way back home. A sequel, The Lost Vikings 2, was released in 1997.

Plot
Three Vikings—Erik the Swift, Baleog the Fierce, and Olaf the Stout—get kidnapped by Tomator, emperor of the alien Croutonian empire, for an inter-galactic zoo. They are able to escape the ship, but get lost in various periods of time. They must traverse various bizarre locations, and eventually confront and defeat Tomator, to find their way home.

Gameplay

The Lost Vikings is a side-scrolling platform adventure in which the player alternates control of the three Viking characters, guiding each of them one at a time (though control may be swapped from character to character at any point) from a designated start point in each level to the exit. The game offers a two-player cooperative mode in which each player simultaneously controls one Viking and is allowed to change control to the third, unused Viking at any point. Every level is designed such that each Viking must contribute his unique skills to help the other two through to the end. Similarly, to finish the level, all three characters must reach the exit point. The Vikings each have three health points which they can lose by getting hurt by enemies or by falling from great heights. Should any Viking run out of health points, he dies; gameplay will then continue with any remaining Vikings, but the level becomes unwinnable, and the player will eventually have to restart the level and try again. However, the game offers unlimited continues.

Each Viking has the ability to carry and use items—such as keys, bombs, and food (which restores health points)—as well as a unique set of skills:

 Erik can run faster than the other two, can jump, and can bash through some walls (and enemies) with his helmet.
 Baleog can kill enemies with his sword, or from a distance with his bow (and a "life-time supply of arrows"). The bow can also be used to hit switches from a distance.
 Olaf can block enemies and their projectiles with his shield, and use his shield as a hang glider. Olaf's shield can also be used as a platform for Baleog to walk over and to allow Erik to reach higher areas.

Cameo appearances
Both Olaf and Baleog make an appearance in the 1993 game Rock n' Roll Racing; Olaf can be unlocked as a hidden character, while Baleog appears on several billboards advertising "Viking Cola" on the planet Bogmire.

In the 32X version of Blackthorne, all three Vikings appear in a secret area in the second snow level.

The Lost Vikings have also had cameo appearances in Interplay's ClayFighter games: Olaf appeared in Helga's ending in the first ClayFighter, Helga being his girlfriend, but she later dumped him for Tiny; Erik and Baleog's faces appear as animated sculptures in the stage "Clay Keep" (Tiny's stage) in ClayFighter 2: Judgment Clay; in some interviews, Interplay designers hinted one of them would have appeared in the then upcoming ClayFighter III, but that never happened.

They have also appeared as NPCs in MMORPG World of Warcraft in the dungeon Uldaman. One of the quests in Uldaman also requires the player to collect the Shaft of Tsol and Amulet of Gni'Kiv, which spell out "Lost" and "Vik'ing" when read backwards. The shaft and amulet are combined to form the Staff of Prehistoria, which fits the theme of Uldaman and also is an area in The Lost Vikings. In the World of Warcraft: Cataclysm expansion, they feature prominently in a quest line for the Alliance faction in the Badlands area of Eastern Kingdoms. In World of Warcraft: Warlords of Draenor, Olaf can appear as one of the random daily quest NPCs if the players have the Frostwolf Tavern/Lunarfall Inn as a building in their Garrison. In World of Warcraft: Dragonflight, the three brothers come back to a new version of the Uldaman dungon: "Uldaman: Legacy of Tyr". This time, they are the first enemy boss to defeat, as their prolonged stay in the Titan underground complex maddened them.

In the Warcraft III: The Frozen Throne’s "Monolith" scenario, the names for the Dark Troll Commando hero are the same as those for the Lost Vikings: Erik the Swift, Baleog the Fierce and Olaf the Stout.

A unit in StarCraft II is called the Viking, and there is a picture of the unit on their website, subtitled The Lost Vikings. In addition to this, repeatedly selecting the Viking unit in StarCraft II makes the Viking pilot mention Erik, Baleog, and Olaf getting lost, as he tries to contact them. He also sets in co-ordinates for Norse by Norse-west. There is also an arcade console in the Cantina of Battleship Hyperion in StarCraft II called The Lost Viking, which is a playable mini-game.

The Lost Vikings reprised their role as playable characters in the crossover multiplayer online battle arena video game Heroes of the Storm. Unlike other heroes in the game, who are played as a single unit, selecting the Lost Vikings as a hero gives the player control over all three Vikings, allowing them to control them as individuals or to issue commands to all three at once. Erik is faster than most other heroes, and attacks from range with a slingshot. Baleog has the greatest attack power of the three, and throws swords from a medium range, dealing area damage to enemies near his target. Olaf has the highest health pool, and recovers quickly when out of combat.

Reception

Computer Gaming World in 1993 called The Lost Vikings "a clever blend of comedy and role playing". The magazine concluded that "the game is a unique puzzle solving adventure, great for people who enjoy using their cerebral cortex along with their eye to hand coordination". Zach Meston of VideoGames & Computer Entertainment praised the difficult puzzles, humor, distinctive visual style, personable character animation, and upbeat music. He summarized the game as "funny, fresh and challenging enough to keep you playing for hours on end".

Electronic Gaming Monthly in 1994 remarked of the Genesis version that "the music doesn't have the kick of the Super NES version (or the truly colorful graphics)", but that it is generally a well done conversion of "a really good puzzle game".  AllGame stated that it was "methodically paced and intelligently designed" and that "the nice graphics combined with the funny (and sometimes helpful) dialogue gives The Lost Vikings more personality than most other video games. To top it off, the controls are sharp, and the level of challenge is high without being frustrating". Super Gamer magazine gave the SNES version a score of 92%, writing: "A huge variety of puzzles to this Lemmings game. Funny, fun and completely addictive".

Accolades

Nintendo Power ranked The Lost Vikings the seventh-best SNES game of 1993. They lauded the gameplay calling it "deep and compelling" and praised the graphics and sound. Mega placed the game at number 22 in their Top Mega Drive Games of All Time. In 1995, Total! placed the game 52nd on its Top 100 SNES Games. In 1996, Super Play awarded the game 94th in its Top 100 SNES Games of All Time. IGN listed The Lost Vikings 30th in their "Top 100 SNES Games of All Time.  They praised the game calling it a "Masterpiece" and praised the "nearly perfect" puzzle dynamics. In 2018, Complex rated The Lost Vikings 93rd on their "The Best Super Nintendo Games of All Time".

See also 
 Gobliiins, an earlier puzzle-solving game dependent on three different characters
 Fish Fillets NG
 Trine

Notes

References

External links

1993 video games
Amiga games
Blizzard games
Amiga CD32 games
Cooperative video games
DOS games
Fictional Vikings
Game Boy Advance games
Interplay Entertainment games
Nintendo Switch games
PlayStation 4 games
Puzzle-platform games
Side-scrolling platform games
Sega Genesis games
Super Nintendo Entertainment System games
Video games about time travel
Video games scored by Allister Brimble
Video games scored by Charles Deenen
Video games scored by Matt Furniss
Video games set in Egypt
Video games set in the Viking Age
Xbox One games
Windows games
Video games developed in the United States
Multiplayer and single-player video games